The Pilanesberg (formerly Pilandsberg) is a mountain in the North West Province, South Africa. The mountain is an ancient volcanic structure, circular in shape, that rises from flat surrounding plains. It is formed by three concentric ridges or rings of hills, of which the outermost has a diameter of about 24 km. The Pilanesberg is located 100 km to the North-West of Pretoria and is for the greater part enclosed in a protected area known as Pilanesberg National Park.

The Elands River flows South of the Pilanesberg in an Easterly direction. There are a number of platinum mines right at the perimeter of the crater formation.

The name "Pilanes" comes from a historic Tswana chief named Pilane.

Geology
Although geographically located within the Witwatersrand range, the mountain is geologically part of a feature known as the Pilanesberg Alkaline Ring Complex. It is a vast ring dike of a very ancient extinct volcano that last erupted some 1,200 million years ago.

The Pilanesberg is one of the largest volcanic complexes of its type; there are few similar alkaline volcanic structures in the world. Different types of syenites, including a number of rare minerals, occur in the crater area.

The formation of the Pilanesberg occurred 2 billion years ago. As its zenith, the volcano towered to 7,000 metres in height. Over the time, a series of volcanic eruptions occurred. There were further outpourings of lava, craters collapsed, ring fracturing took place around the volcano and magma was squeezed into these fractures. The result is several "onion rings" of rocks of different ages. Erosion over many millions of years has stripped away the mountain and the highest peak. What we see today is not so much a volcanic crater, but a cross section through the magma pipes that were located at great depth below the mountain's summit.

See also
Pilanesberg National Park
Pilanesberg International Airport
Sun City

References

External links

NASA Earth Observatory hi-res photos and article, 22 July 2015
Travel Guide and Information. Interactive 3 D Map and Photographs of the Pilanesberg National Park
The Pilanesberg Game Reserve Travel & Safari Guide
Platmin Platinum Mine, Pilanesberg, South Africa
Platmin halts work at Pilanesberg

Landforms of North West (South African province)
Mountains of South Africa
Proterozoic calderas
Volcanoes of South Africa